Model City is a hamlet in the town of Lewiston in Niagara County, New York, United States.

It was proposed in the 1890s as an urban utopia by railroad lawyer and con man William T. Love (born 26 May 1856 in Keokuk, Iowa), who had first tried a similar investment scheme in Huron, South Dakota earlier in 1890. He planned Model City to be "The most beautiful [park] in the world" and planned housing for more than 1 million people and a canal and hydroelectric plant. Love promised in his advertising pamphlets that the city would be free of smog-filled skies, that the land would be beautifully landscaped, housing and quality of life would be a cut above even the loveliest urban environments.

However, his plans were never realized, despite the approval of the state government in 1893. Amid the panic of 1894 his investors backed out and development stopped, with the only visitors to Model City now being "curious reporters and bill collectors," trying to find an absent Love. He claimed to have left for England in 1897, seeking foreign investment. Instead, having absconded with an unknown quantity of money, he practiced law in Cordova, Alaska for several years, then attempted to start a new model city scheme in the Puget Sound area before settling on Lomax, Illinois in 1911. By 1914 "New Lomax" was bust, with Love netting $250,000. In 1929 he tried once more, claiming to have 15,000 acres for the location of "New City," Delaware, which similarly failed to materialize.

By the mid 1990s, Model City was "little more than a rural road with a few dozen families" and a bar. Ironically, despite its environmentally-friendly conception Model City is now home to an enormous landfill owned by Waste Management.

Connection to Love Canal
The name of Love Canal was taken from the name of William T. Love. His "Love's Canal", which would connect the two levels of the Niagara River, would be the basis for this booming Model City. It would be a shipping lane. He abandoned the idea after digging only 4,600 feet of his canal, this segment of which was within the present-day city of Niagara Falls. He had also constructed a few streets before creditors repossessed the construction equipment and the last of his property in 1910.

This same canal, after being used as a toxic waste dump and holding more than 20,000 tons of chemical waste, had a school and a neighborhood built on top of it. It subsequently became a major environmental disaster that would be exposed in the 1970s.

References

Lewiston (town), New York
Hamlets in New York (state)
Hamlets in Niagara County, New York